Isocoma humilis, common names Zion goldenbush or Zion jimmyweed, is a rare North American plant species in the family Asteraceae. It has been found only in southern Utah in the United States. Some of the populations lie inside Zion National Park.

Herbage is covered with copious hairs.

References

humilis
Flora of Utah
Endemic flora of the United States
Plants described in 1991
Flora without expected TNC conservation status